The 1995–1997 FIRA Trophy was the 31st edition of the European rugby union championship for national teams. The 1995-97 edition was arranged once again with a new format.

Due preparations for the 1995 Rugby World Cup, France, Italy and Romania did not participate in the 1994-95 season of the competition, so for that season a Preliminary Tournament was arranged with ten other teams. The higher ranked seven teams were admitted to this tournament, with France, Italy and Romania.

The tournament was undergoing a difficult time, due to decreased interest from the strongest teams: France usually sent reserve teams, and Italy were playing matches  with the likes of Australia, England and Wales.

This is evident looking the results and the programme. France played the first round robin with their Military team, Italy and Romania did not arrange a match for this tournament, but played a match on neutral ground against Argentina for the "Latina Cup". Italy sent two lower level teams to play (during the same weekend) the last two matches.  The previous edition's final between Italy and France was played in March 1997, while the 1996-97 edition was already half completed.

This edition was the first ever triumph of Italy in the competition, defeating France by 40-32 in the final,
 thus cementing their claims to be the sixth European rugby nation powerhouse.
Italy had started to play in this tournament with France in 1966 and, despite some close results, had never previously beaten their strong rivals.  Italy's win, shortly after France had won the 1997 Five Nations Championship, was a historical feat that proved to be crucial for Italy's admission at the Six Nations Championship in 2000.

First Division

Preliminary tournament 

Three directly admitted
 
 
 

And seven qualified from the preliminary tournament

Pool A 

 France qualified to Final

Pool B 

 Italy qualified to the final

 This was the heaviest defeat of Portugal until their defeat to New Zealand (108-13) at the 2007 Rugby World Cup

Final

Second Division

Pool 1 (Gold)

Pool 2 (Silver)

Third Division

Pool 1

Pool 2

Pool 3

Notes and references

Bibliography 
 Francesco Volpe, Valerio Vecchiarelli (2000), 2000 Italia in Meta, Storia della nazionale italiana di rugby dagli albori al Sei Nazioni, GS Editore (2000) .
 Francesco Volpe, Paolo Pacitti (Author), Rugby 2000, GTE Gruppo Editorale (1999).

1995–97
1995–96 in European rugby union
1996–97 in European rugby union
1995 rugby union tournaments for national teams
1996 rugby union tournaments for national teams
1997 rugby union tournaments for national teams